Triplogyna is a genus of South American sheet weavers that was first described by Alfred Frank Millidge in 1991.

Species
 it contains only two species.
Triplogyna ignitula (Keyserling, 1886) − Brazil, Argentina
Triplogyna major Millidge, 1991 − Colombia

See also
 List of Linyphiidae species (Q–Z)

References

Araneomorphae genera
Linyphiidae
Spiders of South America